The Street Sense Stakes is a Grade III American Thoroughbred horse race for two-year-olds over a distance of  miles on the dirt scheduled annually in late October or early November at Churchill Downs in Louisville, Kentucky. The event currently offers a purse of $200,000.

History

The event is named after Street Sense the 2006 U.S. Champion Two-Year-Old Colt who won the Breeders' Cup Juvenile at Churchill Downs and won the 2007 Kentucky Derby.

The event was inaugurated on 27 October 2013 and run over a distance of one mile and was won by John C. Oxley's Coastline. 
Coastline starting at odds of 4/1 was ridden by jockey Shaun Bridgmohan who pressed the pace three wide, gained a short lead with a furlong to go and drew clear to win by three lengths over Ichiban Warrior in a time of 1:36.77.

The most impress of the winners of the event was the 2018 winner Improbable who dominated the field, winning by  lengths. As a four-year-old, Improbable won three Grade I events and was second in the 2020 GI Breeders' Cup Classic. His performance earned him U.S. Champion Older Male Horse honors.

In 2020, the distance for the event was increased to  mile.  

In 2022 the event was upgraded by the Thoroughbred Owners and Breeders Association to a Grade III.

Records
Speed record
 miles: 1:44.30 – King Fury (2020)
 1 mile: 1:35.55  – McCraken (2016)

Margins
  lengths – Improbable (2018)

Most wins by a jockey
 2 – Shaun Bridgmohan (2013, 2014)
 2 – Brian Hernandez Jr. (2016, 2020)

Most wins by a trainer
 2 – Mark E. Casse (2013, 2014)
 2 – Ian R. Wilkes (2016, 2017)

Most wins by an owner
 No owner has won the event more than once

Winners

See also
 List of American and Canadian Graded races

References

2013 establishments in Kentucky
Churchill Downs horse races
Flat horse races for two-year-olds
Graded stakes races in the United States
Grade 3 stakes races in the United States
Recurring sporting events established in 2013